Meszlényi Attila (born 2 May 1954 in Budapest) is an ecological writer, painter, animated film director, musician, and composer. His work as a painter and thinker is dominated by the theme of nature and our relation to it.

Attila Meszlényi has lived in seclusion since 2006. He prefers not to exhibit his work, publishing only on the Internet. His more recent works in relation to the ecology topic are available in parts online. Meszlényi Attila states: “every piece of work is worthy of respect only if it creates more value than it destroys; the canvas coated in paint by itself is no more valuable than the flax and cotton it is made of.” 

Career 
Graduated in applied graphic arts from Képző- és Iparművészeti Szakközépiskola (Fine and Applied Arts School) in 1972. Against his parents’ and teachers’ wishes, he did not continue his education as he did not want to move away from everyday life. He also believed that self-education was worth more than institutional education. He spent the following years doing various, mostly physical jobs such as baker, stone sculptor, decorator, plumber etc. He continued his art activities in his free time beginning to turn towards films.

Attila Meszlényi took part in a study called ‘A magyar film formanyelve és közleménye’ about film semiotics in cooperation with László Beke, Özséb Horányi, András Lányi and Róbert Vadas led by Péter Józsa. Spotted by Foky Ottó, he started directing animated films in Pannónia Filmstúdió from 1977 to ’79, mostly parts of the popular cartoon series ‘Frakk, a macskák réme’,.

After the series ended, he started working as a freelance graphic designer. Made covers and illustrations for no less than two hundred books, drew many slide films, occasionally took commercial graphic design work orders as well. Since 1980, he is member of Művészeti Alap (Artist Fund) and its successor organisation Magyar Alkotóművészek Országos Egyesülete (National Association of Hungarian Artists).

In 1983, he founded an early music ensemble, Musica Profana, in which he played the Baroque flute and musette till 1993.

Due to the instigation of Muray Róbert and Dr. Zoltán Attila, from 1987, he started painting wild birds and mammals of Europe and occasionally other continents, mixing naturalist depiction with various stylistic elements.

In 1990, he founded (and has been leading ever since) the TARON TÁRSASÁG (called Gondolkodókör after 2001).
Between 1998 and 2006, he was a regular participant of national exhibitions, fine art biennales. He keeps painting animals, animal and plant remains using watercolour or oil. Since 1999, he has been member of the Magyar Vízfestők Társasága (Association of the Hungarian Watercolour Painters). He co-founded the Unikornis fine art group with Péchy Tamás in 2001. Its members: Csíkszentmihályi Róbert sculptor, Nagy Judit gobelin artist, Nemes István painter and graphic artist, Szemadám György fine artist, Péchy Tamás environmentalist and Sárosdy Judit art historian.
In recent years, he has mainly been painting and publishing his art-, ecology-themed books, writings.

Solo exhibitions 
1985 Körmend, Batthyány Castle, Hungary
1987 Budapest, Hotel Mercure Buda, Hungary (together with Katalin Nagy)
1988 Körmend, Batthyány Castle, Hungary
1996 Budapest, Írók Boltja, Hungary
1998 Budapest, Természet Stúdió, Hungary (together with Valaczkai Erzsébet)
1998 Brüsszel, Contact Point Hungary, Belgium (together with László Péter)
1999 Budapest, Vigadó Galéria, Hungary (Enteriőr–Miliő)
2014 Sepsiszentgyörgy, Bene Ház, Romania
2014 Keszthely, a Helikon Kastélymúzeum Vadászati Múzeuma, Hungary

Selected collective exhibitions 
1998 „Csergezán Pál” Országos Pályázati Kiállítás, Szántódpuszta, Siotours Kiállítóterem, Hungary (Csergezán-díj)
1999 ’English water-colour by Hungarian Brush’ Hatvan, Moldvay Győző Galéria, Hungary
1999 ’Coloured Drawing’ National Mini-drawing Exhibition. Budapest, Nádor Galéria, Hungary
2000 XVII. National Water-colour Biennale, Eger, Dobó István Vármúzeum, Hungary
2000 X. National Drawing Biennale, Salgótarján, Nógrádi Történeti Múzeum, Hungary
2000 „Tér rajz” National Mini-drawing Exhibition, Budapest, Nádor Galéria, Hungary
2001 ’English water-colour by Hungarian Brush II’, Budapest, Újpest Galéria, Hungary
2002 IX. Panel Painting Biennale, Szeged, Olasz Kulturális Központ, Hungary
2002 XVIII. National Water-colour Biennale, Eger, Trinitárius templom, Hungary
2003 ’English water-colour by Hungarian Brush III’, Budapest, Újpest Galéria, Hungary
2003 Exhibition of Unikornis Group, Budapest, Csepel Galéria, Hungary
2004 XIX. National Water-colour Biennale, Eger, Trinitárius templom, Hungary
2004 Exhibition of Unikornis Group, Szentendre, Régi Művésztelepi Galéria, Hungary
2005 Exhibition of Unikornis Group, Budapest, Karinthy Szalon, Hungary
2006 ’Szívügyek’, Szentendre, Művészet Malom, Hungary
2006 XX. National Water-colour Biennale, Eger, Hungary
2006 ’English water-colour by Hungarian Brush IV’, Szekszárd, Művészetek Háza; Eger, Hungary

Public collections 
Magyar Mezőgazdasági Múzeum, Budapest
Dobó István Vármúzeum, Eger

Public art 
Plaque of Muray Róbert (Budapest XIII. ker., Visegrádi Str. 23. Hungary, 2013.).

Awards 
1984 – Won the Award for Excellence from Magyar Diafilmgyártó Vállalat
1992 – First Prize at the international memorial competition – NATUREXPO.
1998 – Won the Csergezán Award

Animated films 
Hajrá, vadmacskák! (Frakk, a macskák réme)
Gumicsont (Frakk, a macskák réme, III. season)
Egy tollseprő tündöklése (Frakk, a macskák réme, III. season)
Egér pongyolában (Frakk, a macskák réme, III. season)
Ki táncol Lukréciával? (Frakk, a macskák réme, III. season)
Mit hoz a télapó? (Frakk, a macskák réme, III. season)
Tündér Erzséböt (as co-director of Imre István)

Books 
Ez a kapa, ez a kasza [Hungarian Nursery Rhyme] (Móra Ferenc Könyvkiadó, Budapest 1984)
Csigakalauz [Snail Guide]
Emberi tanítás [Human Teaching] 
Nyúlkalauz [Rabbit Guide]
Sünkalauz [Hedgehog Guide]
A világvége illemtana [Etiquette of the Doomsday]
Olajfestés – vadon élő állatok [Oilpainting – Wild Animals]
Művészeti állatismeret [Artistic Zoology]

Selected publications 
Kiáltványok [Manifestos for Art]; Mozgó Világ 1981/10
A musette, a dudák királynője [Musette– The Queen of Bagpipes]; Magyar Zene 1987/4
Poems; Pompeji 1992/2
Ne nézz a dobozember szemébe… [Do Not Look into the Box Man's Eyes...]; Liget 1997/11
Humanista jelképek [Humanistic Symbols]; Liget 1995/12
Egy természetfestő naplójából [From the Diary of a Wildlife Painter]; Nimród 1998/9
Szponzorok [Sponsors]; Madártávlat 2003/2
A létvédelem [Environmental Protection]; Napút 2003/4
Seattle főnök beszédei [Speeches of Chief Seattle]; Napút 2003/7

Published (musical) compositions 
A tenger éneke [Song of the Sea]; Ananda Sounds Edition
(Sheet music) Könnyű darabok gitárra 17. és 18. századi művekből [Easy Pieces for Guitar; 17th and 18th Century Works]; Rózsavölgyi és Társa, Budapest

Recordings 
Begone Sweet Night (baroque recorder, musette; with Musica Profana Ensemble)
Puer natus in Betlehem (musette; with Capella Savaria band)
A tenger éneke [Song of the Sea] (baroque recorder; with István Kozma and Zsolt Szabó)

Further reading 

Tamás Márok: Egy szabálytalan természetfestő. Meszlényi Attila arcképe [An Irregular Wildlife Painter. Portrait of Attila Meszlenyi]; Nimród, 1999/3
Egy festőművész gondolatai a természetről, festészetről. (A festővel beszélgetett Péchy Tamás)[A Painter's Thoughts about Nature, Painting. The Painter Interviewed by Tamás Péchy]; Madártávlat, 1999/5. 9.p.
Erzsébet Valaczkai: Meszlényi Attila. Vadgazda, 2003/5
János Szarka: A Meszlényi-féle aszú... a királyok bora! [The Meszlényi Nectar… Savoury of theKings!]; Magyar Vadászlap, 2006/9, 574-575.p.
Katalin Keserü: Foreword for the catalogue of the XVII. National Drawing Biennale; Dobó István Vármúzeum, Eger 2000
Katalin Benedek: Foreword for the catalogue of the XVIII. National Drawing Biennale; Dobó István Vármúzeum, Eger 2002
Ernő P. Szabó: Foreword for the catalogue of the XIX. National Drawing Biennale; Dobó István Vármúzeum, Eger 2004
Tamás Vásárhelyi: Az unikornisról. [About the Unicorn]; Élet és irodalom, 2003. április 25.
Judit Sárosdy: Legendás valóság. Az Unikornis csoport kiállítása [Legendary Reality. Exhibition of the Unikornis Group]; Új Művészet, 2004/11
Lajos Szakolczay: A szép törhetetlensége. Az Unikornis Csoport kiállítása a Karinthy Szalonban [Infrangibility of Beauty.Exhibition of the Unikornis Groupinthe Karinthy Salon]; Mai Magyar Kultúra, 2005/4

References 

1954 births
Living people
Animal painters
Botanical illustrators
Environmental artists
Landscape artists
Hungarian contemporary artists
Hungarian painters
Hungarian illustrators
Hungarian animators
Hungarian animated film directors